The Regionalliga is the fourth level of ice hockey in Germany. It was founded in 1961 as the Gruppenliga, and was renamed the Regionalliga for the 1965–66 season. From 1961 to 1973, it operated as the third level of German ice hockey, before being dropped to the fourth level for the 1974–75 season. For 2013–14, there were five regions of the league, the Regionalliga West, Regionalliga Nord, Regionalliga Ost, Regionalliga Südwest, and the Bayernliga.

External links
German Ice Hockey Federation

4